The Junior Open Championship is a biennial event, to which all golfing nations affiliated to The R&A are invited to enter their best under-16 boy and girl golfers. In 2016, 80 countries were represented in the starting field of 143 competitors contrasting with 2002 when a total of 86 boys and girls from 58 countries took part. Boys and girls compete in the same event but play off different tees.

The Junior Open is closely linked to The Open Championship and is always played on a nearby course in the same week in July. All competitors are invited to attend The Open after the conclusion of their own event.

The competition came under the R&A's administrative umbrella in 2000, having been founded in 1994.

Notable players
Future 2018 Masters Tournament winner Patrick Reed won this championship in 2006, Jordan Spieth was runner-up in 2008.

Results

Future venues
2024 - Kilmarnock (Barassie)

References

External links
The Junior Open - Official R&A website

Junior golf tournaments
Amateur golf tournaments in the United Kingdom
Golf tournaments in the United Kingdom
R&A championships
Youth sport in the United Kingdom
Recurring sporting events established in 1994